Ixora beckleri, commonly known as brown coffeewood, is a species of flowering plant in the family Rubiaceae. It is endemic to rainforests of eastern Australia, south to Forster in New South Wales.

References

beckleri
Flora of New South Wales